Radmer is a municipality in the district of Leoben in Austrian state of Styria.

Population

References

Ennstal Alps
Cities and towns in Leoben District